Imbricaria nadayaoi is a species of sea snail, a marine gastropod mollusk in the family Mitridae, the miters or miter snails.

Description
The length of the shell attains 26.9 mm.

Distribution
This marine species occurs off the Philippines.

References

 Bozzetti L. (1997). Three new species of Gastropoda from deep water off the Philippines. Apex. 12(1): 43–47.

Mitridae
Gastropods described in 1997